Ophichthus mystacinus is an eel in the family Ophichthidae (worm/snake eels). It was described by John E. McCosker in 1999. It is a marine, deep water-dwelling eel which is known from New Caledonia, in the western Pacific Ocean.

The species epithet "mystacinus" means "mustachioed" in Greek.

References

mystacinus
Taxa named by John E. McCosker
Fish described in 1999